Justin William Goodwin (born 15 July 1976) is a New Zealand international lawn bowler.

Bowls career
Goodwin has represented New Zealand at the Commonwealth Games, in the triples event at the 2006 Commonwealth Games.

He won a gold medal in the triples with Gary Lawson and Richard Girvan, at the 2005 Asia Pacific Bowls Championships in Melbourne.

References

External links
 
 
 

New Zealand male bowls players
1976 births
Living people
Bowls players at the 2006 Commonwealth Games
20th-century New Zealand people
21st-century New Zealand people